Antiwar.com is a website that describes itself as devoted to non-interventionism and as opposing imperialism and war. It is a project of the Randolph Bourne Institute. The website states that it is "fighting the next information war”.

History
The site was founded in December 1995 by Justin Raimondo and Eric Garris, as a response to the Bosnian war. It is a 501(c)(3) nonprofit foundation, operating under the auspices of the Randolph Bourne Institute, based in Atherton, California. It was previously affiliated with the Center for Libertarian Studies and functioned before that as an independent, ad-supported website.

In 2006, Google suspended it from its AdSense advertising network, which was then the source of a significant portion of its income, due to its hosting of explicit photos of abuses committed by United States troops at the Abu Ghraib prison in Iraq, categorised by Google as "gore".

Stance
The site's first objective "was to fight against intervention in the Balkans under the Clinton presidency." It "applied the same principles to Clinton's campaigns in Haiti and Kosovo and bombings of Sudan and Afghanistan." Antiwar.com opposed the US wars in Iraq and Afghanistan and generally opposes interventionism, including the US bombing of Serbia and the recently ceased US occupation of Afghanistan. It has also condemned aggressive military action and other forms of belligerence on the part of other governments, as well as what contributors view as the fiscal and civil liberties consequences of war. Wen Stephenson of The Atlantic described the site as marked by "a decidely  right-wing cast of thought." Its founders characterize themselves as libertarians, and the two principal co-founders were involved in libertarian Republican politics, at the time. Salon.com describes it as "right-wing"; The Guardian describes it as "libertarian, anti-interventionist"; and James Kirchick in The Washington Post calls it a "paleoconservative clearinghouse".

The site publishes opinion from a range of perspectives, publishing "critiques of American foreign policy from the far left and the far right" and featuring writers such as the paleoconservative isolationist Pat Buchanan, right libertarians such as Ron Paul, and left libertarians such as Noam Chomsky and Juan Cole, and Code Pink co-founder Medea Benjamin.

Lawsuit filed against the FBI   
In 2011, the site discovered it was being monitored by the Federal Bureau of Investigation. After their Freedom of Information Act request failed to produce results, they worked with the American Civil Liberties Union of Northern California which in May 2013 filed a freedom of the press lawsuit for full FBI records on Antiwar.com, Eric Garris and Justin Raimondo. The documents received in November 2013 indicated that the FBI in San Francisco, and later in Newark, New Jersey, began monitoring the site after Eric Garris passed along to the FBI a threat to hack the Antiwar.com website. The FBI mistakenly took this as an actual threat against its own website and began monitoring Antiwar.com and its editors. Eric Garris demanded the FBI correct its file. In September 2019, the Ninth Circuit Court of Appeals ruled that the FBI must delete its memo documenting Garris' First Amendment activities.

In 2013, Eric Garris, Justin Raimondo, and Antiwar.com began a lawsuit against the FBI for incorrectly identifying Garris as a national security "threat," and conducting an investigation into Antiwar.com as a potential threat.  The lawsuit was conducted by the American Civil Liberties Union. One issue was that the FBI had incorrectly naming Garris as threatening to hack the FBI website (after Garris reported a threat he received against Antiwar.com). The federal court ordered the FBI to amend their files and issue a correction to Garris. In 2017, the court ordered the FBI to give Antiwar.com access to all the records of the investigation without redaction and to pay $300,000 to the ACLU lawyers. Antiwar.com lost the part of the case that claimed violations of the Privacy Act by the FBI.  Antiwar.com and the ACLU appealed the Privacy Act claim and the appeal went to the 9th Circuit Court of Appeals. In 2019, the 9th Circuit three-judge panel unanimously ruled against the FBI and order them to expunge all records from the investigation. Civil Liberties groups like the ACLU and the Electronic Frontier Foundation hailed the ruling as a victory for privacy rights of journalists and activists.

Personnel
Notable site personnel have included:
Justin Raimondo (1951–2019), founder and editorial director
Eric Garris, founder, webmaster, and managing editor
Scott Horton (born 1976), assistant editor

Notable contributors
Featured writers include:

Praful Bidwai
Alan Bock
Ivan Eland
Philip Giraldi
Ran HaCohen
David R. Henderson
Justin Raimondo
Michael Scheuer
George Szamuely

The site syndicates columns and op-eds by such authors as:

Pat Buchanan
Kevin Carson
Noam Chomsky
Alexander Cockburn
Juan Cole
Jonathan Cook
Reese Erlich
Robert Fisk
Kathy Kelly
Jack Matlock
William Lind
Ron Paul
John Pilger
Gareth Porter
Charley Reese
Paul Craig Roberts
Cindy Sheehan
Norman Solomon

Antiwar Radio
Antiwar Radio is hosted by Scott Horton (radio host) and others including Charles Goyette. It features interviews focused on war, international relations, the growth of state power, civil liberties, and related matters. Guests have included:

Mark Ames
Julian Assange
David T. Beito
James Bovard
Francis Boyle
David Bromwich
Noam Chomsky
Patrick Cockburn
Juan Cole
Robert Dreyfuss
Jeff Frazee
Sibel Edmonds
Ivan Eland
Daniel Ellsberg
Philip Giraldi
Charles Goyette
Glenn Greenwald
William Norman Grigg
David R. Henderson
Nat Hentoff
Robert Higgs
Scott Horton
Dahr Jamail
Raed Jarrar
Karen Kwiatkowski
Jim Lobe
Trevor Lyman
Eric Margolis
Ray McGovern
Cole Miller
Brandon Neely
Robert Pape
Ron Paul
Gareth Porter
Coleen Rowley
Kirkpatrick Sale
Michael Scheuer
Cindy Sheehan
Helen Thomas
Christina Tobin
Jesse Trentadue
Jesse Walker
Philip Weiss
Andy Worthington
Kevin Zeese

Reactions
The Washington Posts Linton Weeks described it "a thoughtful, well-organized site" in 1999. Scott McConnell of The American Conservative wrote in 2010 the New York Press that Antiwar.com was "strikingly successful" and "could claim more readers than Rupert Murdoch’s Weekly Standard once the [Balkan] war began." When Raimondo died in 2019, Patrick Buchanan said that "In the three decades since [1991], no man in America worked harder or did more to resist the interventionist impulses of the American establishment and the wars they produced than Justin and his Antiwar website.”

David Bernstein included it in 2012 among "far left anti-Israel sites that have ties to the anti-Semitic far-right or are known for playing footsie with anti-Semitism". Antisemitism scholar David Renton in 2021 gave the website as an example of how "ideas [which] started in the American far right... migrated into British left-wing circles without people having any idea where they began." Anti-fascist researcher Matthew N. Lyons describes the "paleocon-sponsored" website as an example of left-right alliance.

In 2019, researchers from The Open University found that the crowdsourced MyWOT program labeled Antiwar.com as "trustworthy", while the OpenSources evaluator tagged the website as "conspiracy, clickbait and bias".

See also
 List of anti-war organizations

References

External links
 Antiwar.com
 PBS Newshour with Jim Lehrer, “Voices of Dissent,” May 24, 1999
 New York Press, Scott McConnell, “The New Peaceniks,” June 22, 1999.
 The Atlantic Online, “Not Your Father's Antiwar Movement,” April 14, 1999
 “Intrepid Antiwarriors of the Libertarian Right”, San Francisco Weekly, December 10, 2003.

American political websites
Anti–Iraq War groups
Criticism of neoconservatism
Internet properties established in 1995
Libertarian publications
Libertarianism in the United States
Non-interventionism